The following is a list of the 15 cantons of the Alpes-de-Haute-Provence department, in France, following the French canton reorganisation which came into effect in March 2015:

 Barcelonnette
 Castellane
 Château-Arnoux-Saint-Auban
 Digne-les-Bains-1
 Digne-les-Bains-2
 Forcalquier
 Manosque-1
 Manosque-2
 Manosque-3
 Oraison
 Reillanne
 Riez
 Seyne
 Sisteron
 Valensole

References